Emmanuel Desgeorges (born 15 May 1970) is a French former professional footballer who played as a centre forward. He played in Ligue 2 with FC Gueugnon, Amiens SC and ES Wasquehal.

References

1970 births
Living people
French footballers
FC Aurillac Arpajon Cantal Auvergne players
SO Romorantin players
US Joué-lès-Tours players
FC Gueugnon players
Amiens SC players
Wasquehal Football players
Ligue 2 players
Association football forwards